Road 82 is a road in central Iran connecting Safashahr to Bavanat, Harat, Shahr-e-babak, Rafsanjan and Zarand.

References

External links 

 Iran road map on Young Journalists Club

Roads in Iran